Sing Another Chorus is a 1941 American film starring Jane Frazee.

Plot
Andy Peyton comes home from college, wanting not to work for his father's failing garment business but to be involved in stage shows and entertainment. A former burlesque queen, Francine LaVerne, encourages him in this pursuit.

Edna, loyal secretary to Arthur Peyton at his dress business, and Stanislaus, the janitor, suggest that to mark the company's 25th anniversary, Andy put on a show. After being tricked out of thousands of dollars by a con artist, Theodore Gateson, it looks like the end for Mr. Peyton's business.

However, the show staged by Andy is a huge hit, Gateson is found, the money is recovered, Edna falls in love with Andy and a Broadway producer is interested in making the show a smash.

Cast
 Jane Frazee as Edna
 Johnny Downs as Andy
 Mischa Auer as Stanislaus
 George Barbier as Arthur Peyton
 Iris Adrian as Francine
 Walter Catlett as Gateson

External links
 

1941 films
American black-and-white films
1941 musical films
American musical films
Universal Pictures films
1940s English-language films
1940s American films